SCY1-like 1 (S. cerevisiae), also known as SCYL1, is a human gene which is highly conserved throughout evolution.

Function 
This gene encodes a transcriptional regulator belonging to the SCY1-like family of kinase-like proteins. The protein has a divergent N-terminal kinase domain that is thought to be catalytically inactive, and can bind specific DNA sequences through its C-terminal domain. It activates transcription of the telomerase reverse transcriptase and DNA polymerase beta genes. The protein has been localized to the nucleus, and also to the cytoplasm and centrosomes during mitosis. Multiple transcript variants encoding different isoforms have been found for this gene. At least three of the transcripts code for a protein containing all exons, referred to as full-length (FL).

The mouse homolog of FL-Scyl1 is 90% identical and 93% similar in amino acid content to human FL-Scyl1. In Mus Musculus FL-Scyl1 encodes an 806-amino acid polypeptide. The FL protein contains HEAT repeats and a C-terminal coiled coil domain that also contains multiple dibasic motifs, and ends in the dibasic motif RKLD-COOH.

Scyl1 localizes to the cis-Golgi and ER-Golgi Intermediate Compartment (ERGIC). Scyl1 binds to Coatomer I (COPI) and colocalizes with beta-COPI and ERGIC53. siRNA mediated knockdown of the protein disrupted retrograde flow of the KDEL receptor from the Golgi to the ER. Furthermore, Scyl1 localization in rat hippocampal neurons also demonstrates a similar relationship to COPI.

Clinical significance 
Mutations in Scyl1 are the genetic defect resulting in the phenotype of muscle deficient mice (mdf mice) that suffer from a progressive neurodegeneration of the cerebellum and lower motor neurons. Mdf mice model human spinocerebellar ataxia type disorders.

References

Further reading